Rahatani is a suburb of Pimpri-Chinchwad situated on the banks of the Pavana in Pune district.

The locality is a developing residential area. Its proximity to the Rajiv Gandhi InfoTech Park located at Hinjawadi makes it a residential hub for people working in the Information Technology industry.

Geography and Climate
Rahatani is located on relatively flat land as the area's near it. The suburbs bordering Rahatani are Pimple Saudagar & Wakad the south & West, Kalewadi to the north and Thergaon to the west. Rahatani has the same climate as that of Pune city.

Transport
Rahatani is well connected by road to the rest of the city by public transportation. The nearest airport is Pune Airport, with the Maharashtra government planning to set up a new airport near Chakan. The railway station nearest to this area is Pimpri Railway Station. Pune Mahanagar Parivahan Mahamandal Limited (PMPML) operates the public transport system in this area. The Rainbow BRTS bus system is now operational in Rahatani since November 2015. All local trains between Pune Junction railway station and Lonavala railway station stop at Pimpri railway station.

Education
Some primary schools and pre-primary schools affiliated to MSBTE have been developed in this locality in the past few years. Many schools affiliated to national education boards ICSE and CBSE have been established within the area limits.

Hospitals
 Healing Touch Hospital
 Lotus Multispeciality Hospital
 Bright Smiles Dental & Implant Care
 Omkar Khalane Multispeciality Hospital
 VitaLife Clinic
 B Positive Physiotherapy Clinic
 Metro Hospital
 Vighnaharta Hospital

Schools
 Bhikoba Tambe Highschool
 SNBP International School
 Era Kids A Play School
 Pearls English Medium School
 Path-Shaala

See also
 Pimple Gurav
Thergaon
 Aundh
 Pimpri
 Wakad
 Hinjawadi
 Kalewadi
 Chinchwad (Vidhan Sabha constituency)

References
 http://www.rahatani.in

Neighbourhoods in Pimpri-Chinchwad